Martina Bremini (born 29 December 1982 in Trieste) is an Italian former artistic gymnast. She competed at the 2000 Summer Olympics.

References

External links
 
 

1982 births
Living people
Italian female artistic gymnasts
Gymnasts at the 2000 Summer Olympics
Olympic gymnasts of Italy
Sportspeople from Trieste